Séamus Ó Fearghail, aka James O Farrell, Irish poet and scribe, fl. 1711-1718.

Biography

Paul Walsh (priest) wrote of him in 1920:

"James O Farrell we hear of from Tadhg O Neachtain, already referred to: O Fearghail fa dheóigh Séamus seang/a crich Longphortach aird Eireann/James O Farrell the graceful/from the high land of Longford in Erin. He wrote some folios, now in the British Museum, in 1711. There were other scribes later named O Farrell."

See also
 Richard Tipper

External links
 Gleanings from Irish manuscripts, National Library of Scotland
 http://sources.nli.ie/Search/Results?lookfor=&type=AllFields&author=true&filter[]=personsStr:%22%C3%93%20Fearghail,%20S%C3%A9amus%22

Irish scribes
Irish-language poets
People from County Longford
18th-century Irish writers